Antoine "Fats" Domino Jr. (February 26, 1928 – October 24, 2017) was an American pianist and singer-songwriter. One of the pioneers of rock and roll music, Domino sold more than 65 million records. Between 1955 and 1960, he had eleven Top 10 hits. His humility and shyness may be one reason his contribution to the genre has been overlooked.

During his career, Domino had 35 records in the U.S. Billboard Top 40, and five of his pre-1955 records sold more than a million copies, being certified gold. 
He was a regular on Global Charts , from 1950 to
1965. His musical style was based on traditional rhythm and blues, accompanied by saxophones, bass, piano, electric guitar, and drums.

His 1949 release "The Fat Man" is widely regarded as the first million-selling rock and roll record. Two of his most famous songs are "Ain't That A Shame" and "Blueberry Hill".

Albums

Studio albums

Imperial

ABC-Paramount

Reprise

Various labels

Live albums

Compilation albums

Tribute albums

Singles 
Nationally charted hits are shown in bold.

Billboard Year-End performances

References

External links

Discography
Discographies of American artists
Rock music discographies